Park Jung-geu (born 2 November 1983) is a South Korean handball player who competed in the 2008 and 2012 Summer Olympics and the 2018 Asian Games

References

External links

1983 births
Living people
South Korean male handball players
Handball players at the 2008 Summer Olympics
Handball players at the 2012 Summer Olympics
Olympic handball players of South Korea
Handball players at the 2006 Asian Games
Handball players at the 2010 Asian Games
Handball players at the 2014 Asian Games
Handball players at the 2018 Asian Games
Asian Games gold medalists for South Korea
Asian Games silver medalists for South Korea
Asian Games bronze medalists for South Korea
Asian Games medalists in handball
Medalists at the 2010 Asian Games
Medalists at the 2014 Asian Games
Medalists at the 2018 Asian Games